The 2022 Stockport Metropolitan Borough Council election took place 5 May 2022 to elect members of Stockport Metropolitan Borough Council. This was on the same day as other local elections. 21 of the 63 seats were up for election.

Background
Stockport began as a Conservative council, with Conservative majorities from 1975 to 1982. The Liberal Democrats (Liberal Party from 1973 to 1988) overtook the Conservatives in 1992, and formed their first administration in 1999, before another period of no overall control from 2000 to 2002 with the second Liberal Democrat majority lasting until 2011. A Labour minority administration replaced the Liberal Democrats in 2016, and has survived despite the Liberal Democrats becoming the largest party in 2021. In the 2021 election, the Liberal Democrats made no gains or losses with 30.59% of the vote, Labour lost 1 seat with 31.96%, the Conservatives made no gains or losses with 25.76%, the Green Party won their first seat on the council with 8.15%, and Heald Green Ratepayers kept their seat up for election with 2.21%.

The seats up for election in 2022 were last elected in 2018. In that election, Labour gained 2 seats with 33.4%, the Liberal Democrats lost 1 seat with 31.6%, Conservatives lost 1 seat with 27.1%, and independents made no gains or losses with 2.9%.

Previous council composition

Results 
Changes are compared with the 2021 election.

Results by ward
An asterisk indicates an incumbent councillor. Councillors were last elected in 2018 and changes are compared to those results.

Bramhall North

Bramhall South and Woodford

Bredbury and Woodley

Bredbury Green and Romiley

Brinnington and Central

Cheadle and Gatley

Cheadle Hulme North

Cheadle Hulme South

Davenport and Cale Green

Edgeley and Cheadle Heath

Hazel Grove

Heald Green

Heatons North

Heatons South

Manor

Marple North

Marple South and High Lane

Offerton

Reddish North

Reddish South

Stepping Hill

Changes since this election

Edgeley and Cheadle Heath by-election
A by-election was held on 13 October 2022 in the Edgeley and Cheadle Heath ward due to the death of councillor Sheila Bailey on 3 August 2022. Changes are relative to the 2021 election.

References

Stockport
Stockport Metropolitan Borough Council elections